A Rainy Day is an American animated short from MGM released in 1940. It tells the story of a father bear trying to repair the roof of his house. The second entry in a three-cartoon series, it was preceded in 1939 by Goldilocks and the Three Bears and was followed by Papa Gets the Bird in 1940.

Plot
Mother Bear is singing happily as she cleans the house. Upon entering a room she notices light coming in through a hole in the roof. Annoyed that it has not yet been fixed, she calls to Father bear, disturbing him from his nap in a hammock. As he insists that it is not going to rain that day, the sky suddenly clouds over and a thunder storm rapidly approaches. He reluctantly goes inside to inspect the hole, plugging it with his finger to demonstrate that water would not come in through such a small opening.

Waiting until his wife has left, Father tries to remove his finger, only to find that it has become stuck. He manages to release it whilst also bringing down a section of the roof on his head, leaving a now massive hole. His attempts to set to work are hampered by a series of clumsy mishaps which infuriate him further. Poking her head into the room, Mother tells Father to relax and count to 10, an exercise which ends with him covered in red paint from a paint can that he furiously kicked.

Downstairs in the kitchen, Mother tells their son, Wilbur, to fetch Father a drink of water from the well, as Father struggles to get out onto the roof without damaging it further. The storm finally hits and he is caught in a deluge of rain, as well as struggling with lightning and fierce winds that blow the roof tiles into massive ‘waves’. He falls through the roof into a bedroom that is now completely filled with water. Hearing his son's offers of more water and his wife's incessant singing drift up through the house Father climbs into an underwater bed and, despondent, pulls a blanket over his head as the cartoon ends.

External links
 

Metro-Goldwyn-Mayer animated short films
1940 animated films
1940 short films
1940 films
1940s American animated films
1940s animated short films
Films based on Goldilocks and the Three Bears
Metro-Goldwyn-Mayer cartoon studio short films